Kerala cuisine is a culinary style originated in the Kerala, a state on the southwestern Malabar Coast of India. Kerala cuisine offers a multitude of both vegetarian and non-vegetarian dishes prepared using fish, poultry and red meat with rice as a typical accompaniment. Chillies, curry leaves, coconut, mustard seeds, turmeric, tamarind, asafoetida and other spices are also used in the preparation.

Kerala is known as the "Land of Spices" because it traded spices with Europe as well as with many ancient civilizations with the oldest historical records of the Sumerians from 3000 BCE.

Historical and cultural influences
In addition to historical diversity, cultural influences, particularly the large  introduction of Muslims and Christians, have also added unique dishes and styles to Kerala cuisine, especially non-vegetarian dishes.  

Most modern-day Hindus do not observe religious dietary restrictions, except a few belonging to specific castes that do not consume beef or pork. Most Muslims do not eat pork and other food forbidden by Islamic law. Alcohol is available in Kerala in many hotels and over a thousand bars and liquor stores.

Overview

One of the traditional Kerala dishes is vegetarian and is called the Kerala sadya. A full-course sadya, consists of rice with about 20 different accompaniments and desserts, and is the ceremonial meal of Kerala eaten usually on celebratory occasions including weddings, Onam and Vishu. It is served on a plantain leaf.

Because of its rich trading heritage, over time, various indigenous Kerala dishes have been blended with foreign dishes to adapt them to local tastes. Coconuts grow in abundance in Kerala, so grated coconut and coconut milk are commonly used for thickening and flavouring. 

Kerala's long coastline and numerous rivers have led to a strong fishing industry in the region, making seafood a common part of meals. Rice is grown in abundance along with tapioca. It is the main starch ingredient used in Kerala's food.

Having been a major production area of spices for thousands of years, the region makes frequent use of black pepper, cardamom, clove, ginger, and cinnamon. Kerala also has a variety of breakfast dishes like idli, dosa, appam, idiyappam, puttu, and pathiri.

Hindu cuisine

The vast majority of Kerala's Hindus, except certain communities and ovo-lacto vegetarians, eat fish, red meat (beef, carabeef, and pork) and chicken. There are many vegetarians in Kerala, also throughout India.

Mappila cuisine

Muslim cuisine or Mappila cuisine is a blend of traditional Kerala, Persian, Arab, Portuguese and Western food culture. This confluence of culinary cultures is best seen in the preparation of most dishes. Kallummakkaya (mussels) curry, irachi puttu (irachi meaning meat), Pathiri (a type of rice pancake), and ghee rice are some of the other specialties. The characteristic use of spices is the hallmark of Mappila cuisine—black pepper, cardamom, and clove are used profusely. 

Kuzhi Mandi (Mandi (food)) is another popular item, which has an influence from Yemen. Malabar biriyani is known as Thalassery biriyani which uses kaima rice for preparation and is called as dum biriyani. Malabar biriyani originated from Thalassery and spread to other places.  
 	
The snacks include unnakkaya (deep-fried, boiled ripe banana paste covering a mixture of cashew, raisins and sugar), pazham nirachathu (ripe banana filled with coconut grating, molasses or sugar), muttamala made of eggs, chatti pathiri, a dessert made of flour, like a baked, layered chapati with rich filling, arikkadukka, and more.

Nasrani cuisine

Christians of Kerala—especially Mar Thoma Nasranis (St Thomas Christians)—have their own cuisine which is a blend of Indian, Middle Eastern, Syrian, Jewish and Western styles and flavours of cooking.

A favourite dish of Kerala Christians is mappas, or ishtu. For this dish, chicken/ beef, potatoes, carrots, green peas and onions are simmered gently in coconut milk flavoured with black pepper, cinnamon, coriander, mint, cloves, green chillies, lime juice, and shallots . In Central Kerala, this is made only with beef or lamb, the usage of chicken in stew is very rare. Lamb and duck can replace chicken in the stew recipe.

Pidi is another dish made mainly by Syrian Christians from Central Kerala (Ernakulam and Thrissur), consisting of dumplings made from rice flour boiled in a mixture of coconut milk, cumin seeds and garlic.

Other dishes include piralen (chicken stir-fried), meat thoran/ roast/ullathiyathu (dry curry with shredded coconut), seafood and duck roast, and meen molee (spicy stewed fish). This is eaten with appam. Pork vindaloo and Meen mulakittathu or meen vatichathu (fish in fiery red chilli sauce) is another favourite item.

Latin Christian ceremonial food includes bread and stew are served after cake and wine at the banquet, followed by a meal with fish, cutlets, salads, pork, vindaloo, fish moli, duck roast and mustad (mustard and coriander skins fried in vinegar) are important in their diet.

Irachi ularthiathu, also known as Kerala beef fry is a beef dish cooked with spices.

References

External links

Wikibooks Cookbook: Cuisine of India

 
South Indian cuisine
Indian cuisine by state or union territory